Damastes is a genus of East African huntsman spiders that was first described by Eugène Louis Simon in 1880. It is classified under the family Sparassidae, though its subfamilial classification remains unclear. The subspecies Damastes coquereli affinis is a nomen dubium.

Species
 it contains sixteen species, found on the Seychelles, in Mozambique, and on Madagascar:
Damastes atrignathus Strand, 1908 – Madagascar
Damastes coquereli Simon, 1880 – Madagascar
Damastes decoratus (Simon, 1897) – Madagascar
Damastes fasciolatus (Simon, 1903) – Madagascar
Damastes flavomaculatus Simon, 1880 – Madagascar
Damastes grandidieri Simon, 1880 (type) – Madagascar
Damastes majungensis Strand, 1907 – Madagascar
Damastes malagassus (Fage, 1926) – Madagascar
Damastes malagasus (Karsch, 1881) – Madagascar
Damastes masculinus Strand, 1908 – Madagascar
Damastes nigrichelis (Strand, 1907) – Mozambique
Damastes nossibeensis Strand, 1907 – Madagascar
Damastes oswaldi Lenz, 1891 – Madagascar
Damastes pallidus (Schenkel, 1937) – Madagascar
Damastes sikoranus Strand, 1906 – Madagascar
Damastes validus (Blackwall, 1877) – Seychelles

Trapping prey
An unspecified Damastes species has been observed in the Sava Region of northeast Madagascar predating on vertebrates (frogs, Heterixalus andrakata). The same spider - and others of the same species - also build structures of leaves and silk and hide in the back of them. It is speculated that these are traps for catching these frogs.

See also
 List of Sparassidae species

References

Araneomorphae genera
Sparassidae
Spiders of Africa